These are the results of the women's cross-country event in cycling at the 2004 Summer Olympics. The pre-race favourite, Norway's Gunn-Rita Dahle, dominated the race throughout, despite a fall that damaged the gears on her bicycle. The reigning world champion Sabine Spitz overtook Alison Sydor late in the race to claim bronze, behind Marie-Hélène Prémont. The winner of the gold medal at the previous two Olympics, Paola Pezzo of Italy, did not finish. The race consisted of 1 start loop and 5 full loop, a total of 31.3 km. It was held at 11:00 on 27 August 2004.

Medalists

Results

See also
Cycling at the 2003 Pan American Games – Mountain Bike

References

External links
Official Olympic Report

Women
2004 Women
Olym
Women's events at the 2004 Summer Olympics